Michael Newcomb may refer to:

 Michael D. Newcomb (1952–2010), American psychologist
 Michael E. Newcomb, American clinical psychologist